Les Eyre (7 January 1922 – 19 November 1991) was a footballer who was born in Ilkeston, Derbyshire, England and played for Norwich City.

Career
Eyre played 201 times in all competitions for Norwich City, scoring 69 goals, between 1946 and 1951. His exploits as one of Norwich's all-time leading scorers (see List of Norwich City F.C. club records) won him a place as one of the fan nominees in the inaugural Norwich City Hall of Fame. In 1951, after leaving Norwich, Eyre joined Bournemouth & Boscombe Athletic, scoring 10 goals in 38 league games. Following this spell, Eyre dropped into non-league, playing for Chelmsford City and Bilsthorpe Colliery.

References

1922 births
1991 deaths
English footballers
Norwich City F.C. players
AFC Bournemouth players
Chelmsford City F.C. players
People from Ilkeston
Footballers from Derbyshire
Association football forwards